The Beginning Was Sin (German: Am Anfang war es Sünde) is a 1954 West-German-Yugoslavian drama film directed by František Čáp and starring Ruth Niehaus, Viktor Staal and Hansi Knoteck.

The film's sets were designed by the art director Mirko Lipuzic.

Cast
Ruth Niehaus as Rosalia
Viktor Staal as Jacob, farmer 
Hansi Knoteck as Anna, his wife 
Peter Carsten as Marko, farmworker 
Laya Raki as gypsy dancer 
Edith Schultze-Westrum as Rosalia's mother 
Franz Muxeneder as Toni, farmworker 
Zvonimir Rogoz
Petra Unkel as Therese, maid
Olga Bedjanic as Dora 
Frane Milčinski
Lojze Potokar
Hans Pössenbacher as farmer 
Mila Kacic
Boris Kralj

References

External links

West German films
1954 drama films
German drama films
Yugoslav drama films
Films directed by František Čáp
Films based on works by Guy de Maupassant
Constantin Film films
Yugoslav black-and-white films
German black-and-white films
1950s German films
1950s German-language films